Cador is a surname. Notable people with the surname include:

Rida Cador (born 1981), Hungarian cyclist
Roger Cador (born 1952), American baseball player and coach